Ptychadena longirostris is a species of frog in the family Ptychadenidae. It is found in Côte d'Ivoire, Ghana, Guinea, Liberia, Nigeria, and Sierra Leone, and in possibly in Benin, Senegal, and Togo. Its natural habitats are subtropical or tropical moist lowland forest, intermittent freshwater marshes, and canals and ditches. It is threatened by habitat loss.

References

Ptychadena
Taxonomy articles created by Polbot
Amphibians described in 1870
Taxa named by Wilhelm Peters